The PZL P.11 was a Polish fighter aircraft, designed and constructed during the early 1930s by Warsaw-based aircraft manufacturer PZL. Possessing an all-metal structure, metal-covering, and high-mounted gull wing, the type held the distinction of being widely considered to have briefly been the most advanced fighter aircraft of its kind in the world.

The design of the P.11 commenced during the late 1920s, initially designated as the P.1. The primary individual responsible for its development was Polish aeronautical engineer Zygmunt Puławski, who has been attributed as having designed many of its innovative features. While the majority of the world's forces were still using biplanes, the P.1 used a high-mounted and aerodynamically clean gull wing, which provided the pilot with a superior field of view. During September 1929, the first prototype conducted its maiden flight. The design quickly drew international attention; the general layout became commonly known as the "Polish wing" or "Puławski wing".

The P.11 served as Poland's primary fighter defence throughout the 1930s, including during the Polish campaign of 1939 by neighbouring Nazi Germany. However, as a consequence of the rapid advances in aircraft design during the late 1930s (seen in such fighters as the Messerschmitt Bf 109), it was outclassed by its rivals at the onset of the war. The majority of the Polish Air Force's P.11s were destroyed during 1939; however, it is believed that as many as 36 were flown to Romania and were subsequently taken over by the Romanian Air Force.

The P.11 was a considerable export success. During October 1933, deliveries of Polish-built P.11bs to Romania commenced. From 1936, Romanian aircraft manufacturer Industria Aeronautică Română (IAR) constructed a further 95 aircraft under the designation of IAR P.11f, powered by the Romanian-built IAR 9Krse engine. A dedicated export model of the P.11, which was designated as the PZL P.24, was developed during the late 1930s. Reportedly, Greece, Portugal, Yugoslavia, Turkey and Republican Spain were at one point interested in procuring the P.11; these eventually resulted in several nations, including Bulgaria, Greece and Turkey purchasing the P.24 instead.

Development

Origins
The history of the PZL P.11 started in 1929, when Polish aeronautical engineer Zygmunt Puławski commenced work on designing an all-metal, metal-covered monoplane fighter aircraft. Prior to this, Polish aviation activity had been concentrated on the licensed production of foreign-designed aircraft, particularly French; additionally, these typically had wooden structures, thus Puławski's all-metal approach represented a considerable step-change for Polish industry.

According to aviation author Wiltold Liss, the initial design produced by Puławski, designated as the P.1, possessed multiple of the hallmarks present on contemporary French aviation designs of the era; these similarities can be attributed to Puławski himself, who had received a considerable portion of his technical education in France only a few years prior. Simultaneously, the P.1 also bore a number of original innovations, including its characteristic monoplane wing design. While the majority of the world's forces were still using biplanes, the P.1 used a high-mounted and aerodynamically clean gull wing, which provided the pilot with a superior field of view.

During September 1929, the first prototype conducted its maiden flight. The aircraft demonstrated its outstanding performance amongst its peers, including the British Bristol Bulldog and the French Dewoitine D.27, when it achieved first place at an international air competition held in Bucharest, Romania. The design generated interest around the world; attention was such that the general layout became commonly known as the "Polish wing" or "Puławski wing". This wing consisted of a two-spar duralumin structure, complete with rivetted ribs to both the spars and skin; the exterior of the wing was covered by finely corrugated duralumin sheet, while the slotted ailerons had a fabric covering.

The Polish War Ministry objected to the aircraft's use of the licence-built Hispano-Suiza V engine, citing insufficient practicality and poor economic grounds. Accordingly, a second prototype, which was designated as the P.6, was completed the next year. This revision featured several deviations from Puławski's original vision, including the adoption of a radial engine to power the type in place of the original in-line counterpart; during testing, the P.6's engine was plagued by overheating issues.

Refinement and production
Following the disappointing performance of the P.6, a further improved design, designated as the PZL P.7, was developed. According to Liss, this revision represented the most significant of the P.11's forerunners. The P.7 was placed into series production, having been ordered for the Polish Air Force, who ultimately opted to procure 150 of the type.

After designing the P.7, Puławski started further variants with larger engines, eventually cumulating in the P.11. During August 1931, the first P.11/I prototype conducted its maiden flight, powered by the British Bristol Jupiter radial engine; the first flight had occurred shortly after Puławski's death in an air crash. It was followed by a pair of refined prototypes, the P.11/II and the P.11/III, which used the Bristol Mercury engine instead. They were later joined by several more pre-production aircraft to test out various configurations of engines, propellers, and other features; these test examples led to the P.11/VI, a production-representative version of the design.

The first variant of the P.11 to be ordered by the Polish Air Force was the P.11a. From the onset, this was considered to be only an interim model of the type; accordingly, a series of 50 such fighters were constructed. Otherwise similar to the P.7, the P.11a mounted the 575 hp (429 kW) Bristol Mercury IV S2 radial engine, which was produced in Poland under licence. Upon the completion of the P.11a order, PZL immediately set about establishing the production of an improved model of the aircraft, which was designated as the P.11c.

The P.11c would be the principal (and final) variant of the type to be inducted into the Polish Air Force. First reaching fighter squadrons during late 1935, it featured the adoption of a new, refined fuselage, a major change of which being the relocation of the engine to be 13 cm lower down in the aircraft's nose, which had the advantage of providing the pilot with an improved exterior view. Besides, a new stronger engine Mercury V S2 had smaller diameter. Forward framework was longer, covering an enlarged and more comfortable cockpit, with pilot's seat moved 30 cm rearwards and raised by 5 cm. The central part of the wings was also modified. During 1934, production of the P.11c commenced, by 1936, the type was being produced at a rate of 25 fighters per month; in total, 150 aircraft were produced by the end of production in 1936 (older sources quoted a number of 175, which is not confirmed in any documents). The first series of approximately 50 P.11c aircraft were fitted with Mercury V S2 of 600 hp (447 kW), the rest with Mercury VI S2 of 630 hp (470 kW).

Apart from Poland, Romania showed interest in the new design. Even before the P.11a entered service with the Polish Air Force, 50 aircraft, designated as the P.11b, were ordered for the Romanian Air Force, while an agreement for licence production was agreed. Deliveries of Polish-built P.11bs to Romania commenced in July 1934. They were fitted with Gnome-Rhone 9Krsd Mistral  engines, otherwise they were similar to the P.11a. 49 were finally made, the 50th aircraft being P.11f prototype. After the P.11c had been developed, the Romanians decided to switch the licence production to the new model. As a result, from 1936 IAR built 95 aircraft as the IAR P.11f, powered by the Romanian-built IAR 9Krse engine, which was a licensed version of the Gnome-Rhone 9Krse giving . The Romanians then produced another Polish fighter, the PZL P.24, developed from the P.11 exclusively for export. Greece, Portugal, Yugoslavia, Turkey and Republican Spain were interested in buying the P.11, but finally Bulgaria, Greece and Turkey bought the P.24 instead.

Further development and successors
During 1934, the year in which the P.11 entered operational service, it was a contemporary of the British Gloster Gauntlet and German Heinkel He 51 and was arguably the most advanced fighter then in service in the world. However, due to a series of rapid advances and technological development in the field of aviation, the P.11 was considered to have been rendered obsolete by 1939. It had been overtaken in terms of performance by a new generation of fighter aircraft that commonly benefitted from features such as cantilever wings and retractable landing gear; such fighters included the British Supermarine Spitfire and German Messerschmitt Bf 109.

Together with the older P.7, both remained the only Polish fighters in service, however, with about 185 P.11s available, distributed within six air regiments and the aviation school in Dęblin. Being aware that the P.11 was now outdated, the Polish Air Force had pinned their hopes on the in-development PZL.50 Jastrząb, which suffered from several delays. When it became apparent that the PZL.50 would not be in widespread service in time for a major conflict that was clearly looming, consideration was given to producing an updated version of the P.11; this was to have been powered by the 840 hp (626 kW) Mercury VIII and have been furnished with an enclosed cockpit, known as the P.11g Kobuz (hobby). Only the prototype of the P.11g with a maximum speed increase to a still-slow 390 km/h (~240 mph) was flown before the war, in August 1939.

In light of the unavailability of PZL.50, the only hope of replacing the obsolete P.11 lay in acquiring modern fighters from abroad. In 1939, after receiving the necessary credits, Poland ordered from France 120 Morane-Saulnier M.S.406s, and from Britain, 14 Hawker Hurricane Is (the P.11's chosen replacement), plus a single Supermarine Spitfire I for testing, in addition to 100 Fairey Battle light bombers. However, none of these aircraft were delivered to Poland before September 1939.

Design
The PZL P.11 was an innovative fighter aircraft of the early 1930s, possessing high-mounted gull wings, as well as an all-metal, metal-covered structure. It also possessed several relatively conventional features for the era, such as its use of a fixed undercarriage arrangement. In terms of armament, the P.11 was equipped with a pair of 7.92 mm machine guns mounted upon the sides of the fuselage; reportedly, around a third of all P.11c-model fighters were provisioned with two additional machine guns fixed onto the wings. The fuselage-mounted guns were synchronised, but all others were not; a gun camera could also be installed. In terms of bombs, the P.11c could carry up to four small 12.5 kg bombs, while the earlier P.11a model was not provisioned to carry any.

The P.11 was powered by a number of different radial engines, these included the Bristol Mercury IV S2 (normal: , maximum: 575 hp) of the P.11a, the Gnome-Rhone 9Krsd (550 hp, max: 595 hp) of the P.11b, the Bristol Mercury V S2 (565 hp, max: 600 hp) or alternatively the Mercury VI S2 (590 hp, max: 630 hp) of the P.11c: and finally the Gnome-Rhone 9Krse (560 hp, max: 610 hp) of the P.11f, the ultimate version of the aircraft. Regardless of the engine used, the unit would be mounted upon rubber vibration absorbers inside a forward-mounted engine bay and was used to drive a wooden two-bladed fixed-pitch propeller manufactured by Polish company Szomanski.

The P.11 had an open cockpit, provisioned with a windshield composed of Plexiglas. Instrumentation included a suite of navigation and engine control gauges, while many of these components originated within Poland, one notable exception was the German-built compass. The safety equipment included an arrangement of several flame dampers, a flare gun, and oxygen tanks for the pilot. Only a few P.11s were furnished with radio sets, leading to pilots being typically reliant upon hand signals and pre-arranged manoeuvres to communicate with one another.

The all-metal fuselage of the P.11 was matched to a twin-spar shoulder-mounted wing (which was also all-metal) via bearers set upon the upper portion of the first and second fuselage frames. The wing and the tail employed similar construction techniques, making use of Daude-type rivets, a corrugated duralumin sheet exterior and solid duralumin struts and plates for strengthening. The undercarriage comprised V-shape streamlined struts, furnished with Avia-type oleo pneumatic shock absorbers (including the tail skid) and were braced with steel wire.

The P.11 featured an internal fuel tank positioned inside the fuselage that could be jettisoned in case of fire or other emergency. A high-profile flaw was present in the construction of early-built examples in the form of its fuel tanks. Originally manufactured by an independent sub-contractor, the tanks were rivetted and covered with a resin sealing agent; however, this technique would result in joints that would rapidly degrade in the presence of vibration. An initial effort to switch to welded joints was catastrophic, having been determined to have been responsible for failures early on in the P.11's service life. Following a decision by some customers to refuse acceptance of completed aircraft using this type of joint due to these failures, extensive testing to evaluate alternative techniques was conducted by PZL, resulting in the problem being entirely eliminated.

Operational history

At the outbreak of the Second World War, on 1 September 1939, the Polish Air Force had 109 PZL P.11cs, 20 P.11as and 30 P.7as in combat units. A further 43 P.11c aircraft were in reserve or undergoing repairs. Only a third of P.11c were armed with four machine guns, the rest had only two, and even fewer had a radio. The P.11 were used in twelve escadrilles (eskadra), each with ten aircraft (two escadrilles constituted a squadron, in Polish: dywizjon). Two squadrons—four escadrilles—were in the Pursuit Brigade deployed around Warsaw, with the rest assigned to various armies. All of them took part in the 1939 defense of Poland. Apart from combat units, several P.11 aircraft, including a prototype P.11g, were used in improvised units at air bases.

By 1 September 1939, the fighter squadrons had been deployed to remote improvised airfields and were therefore protected from German air attack on the ground. The P.11 would be up against more modern German bombers and fighters—not only were the German Messerschmitt Bf 109 and Bf 110 faster and better armed, but most German bombers were also faster. Since the P.11 fighters had seen years of intensive use before the war, their maximum speed was even lower than the theoretical 375 km/h. The P.11a's were in even worse condition. In addition, their small total number meant that missions of groups larger than twenty aircraft were rarely undertaken, and reserve machines were almost non-existent.

On the other hand, the Polish fighter aircraft featured better maneuverability than their German counterparts and, as a benefit of their design, much better vision from the cockpit. The P.11 also had a durable construction and a good rate of climb, and could take off from short airfields, even of the rough and improvised variety. It could also dive at up to 600 km/h without risk of the wings breaking off. Theoretically the only limit in maneuvers was the pilot's ability to sustain high g forces. Despite the German superiority, the P.11 managed to shoot down a considerable number of German aircraft, including fighters, but suffered heavy losses as well. The exact numbers are not fully verified. A total of 285 German aircraft were lost according to Luftwaffe records, with at least 110 victories credited to the P.11 for the loss of about 100 of their own. Some of the German aircraft shot down were later recovered and put back into service. This allowed German propaganda to claim smaller combat losses.

At dawn on 1 September, Capt. Mieczysław Medwecki flying a PZL P.11c was shot down by Rottenführer (Foreman Leader) Leutnant Frank Neubert of I./StG 2 (Stuka), having the dubious honour of becoming the first aircraft shot down in the Second World War. The first Allied air victory, the shooting down of a Junkers Ju 87, was achieved 20 minutes later by Medwecki's wingman, Władysław Gnyś, who went on to shoot down a pair of Dornier Do 17s with his P.11c. The P.11c was also the first aircraft to successfully ram an enemy aircraft in the Second World War. The first large air battle of the war took place in the early morning of 1 September over the village of Nieporęt just north of Warsaw, when a German bomber group of about seventy Heinkel He 111 and Dornier Do 17 was intercepted by some twenty P.11 and ten P.7 fighters, and had to abandon their mission to Warsaw.
The following day, nine PZL P-11s of No. 142 Squadron, led by Captain Mirosław Leśniewski, intercepted two formations of Dornier Do 17 on river Vistula. Attacking head on, the Polish pilots managed to shoot down seven twin-engined bombers, two of them credited to Lieutenant Stanisław Skalski (future Distinguished Flying Cross & Two Bars) for no losses to themselves.
Most of the P.11s were destroyed in 1939, though thirty-six were flown to Romania and taken over by the Romanian Air Force. Due to their obsolescence, these veteran aircraft were not used in combat; only a small number were used for training while the rest were dismantled for spare parts. It has been alleged that some aircraft were captured and saw limited use by the Germans. A pair of P.11s were captured by the Red Army and used for testing. One landed in Hungary (near the town of Hajdúböszörmény) and was used as a glider tow plane by the University of Technology in Budapest.

Variants
P.11/I
First prototype of the P.11 fighter, powered by a  Gnome-Rhône Jupiter IX ASb.
P.11/II
Second prototype of the P.11 fighter, powered by a  Bristol Mercury IV.A in a long chord cowling.
P.11/III
Production prototype of the P.11 fighter, powered by a Bristol Mercury, with simplified structure to ease production.
P.11a
The initial version for the Lotnictwo Wojskowe (Polish Air Force), which ordered fifty, actually built after completion of the Romanian P.11b order, powered by  –  Polish Skoda Works Mercuty IV.S2 engines.
P.11b
Fifty aircraft ordered by the Romanian Government, powered by  Gnome-Rhône 9K Mistral or I.A.R. 9K Mistral engines. 49 were actually built.
P.11c
The main production version for Lotnictwo Wojskowe. 150 built.
P.11f
95 aircraft, powered by  I.A.R. 9K Mistral engines, built as licence production by IAR in Romania.
P.11g Kobuz
Developed as a stop-gap to fill in for delayed P.Z.L. P.50 Jastrząb fighters by strengthening the structure to absorb the power of a single  P.Z.L. Mercury VIII, with an enclosed cockpit and four improved  KM Wz 36 machine-guns. The converted P.11c prototype flew for the first time on 15 August 1939, less than a month before the German invasion, forcing abandonment of the programme.

Operators

 Hungarian Air Force operated one ex-Polish Air Force PZL P.11a evacuated on 23 September 1939.

 Latvian Air Force operated one ex-Polish Air Force PZL P.11a evacuated on 17 September 1939.

 Polish Air Force

 Royal Romanian Air Force

 Soviet Air Force took over the Latvian machine when they invaded Latvia 17 June 1940, and two more (see above) as war prizes.

Surviving aircraft
The sole surviving P.11c aircraft is on display in the Polish Aviation Museum in Kraków.

Specifications (PZL P.11c with Mercury VI.S2 engine)

See also

References

Notes

Citations

Bibliography
 Axworthy, Mark. Third Axis, Fourth Ally. London: Arms and Armour, 1995. .
 Belcarz, Bartłomiej and Tomasz J.Kopański. PZL P.11c. Sandomierz, Poland/Redbourn, UK: Mushroom Model Publications, 2003. .
 Belcarz, Bartłomiej, Artur Juszczak, Tomasz Makowski and Robert Pęczkowski. PZL P.11c, Modelmania 2 (Polish/English). Gdańsk, Poland: AJ-Press, 1998. .
 Cynk, Jerzy B. History of the Polish Air Force 1918-1968. Reading, Berkshire, UK: Osprey Publishing Ltd., 1972. .
 
 Eberspacher, Warren A. and Jan P. Koniarek. PZL Fighters Part Two - P.11 Variants (Historical Aircraft Digest 00-5). Austin, CO: Creative & Customized Support, 2001. No ISBN.
 Glass, Andrzej. Polskie konstrukcje lotnicze 1893-1939 (in Polish: "Polish Aviation Constructions 1893-1939"). Warszawa, Poland: WKiŁ, 1977. No ISBN.
 Green, William. Warplanes of the Second World War, Volume Three: Fighters. London: Macdonald & Co.(Publishers) Ltd., 1961. .
 Green, William and Gordon Swanborough. "The Era of the Gulls: The Chronicles of the Pulawski Fighter Line". Air Enthusiast, Twenty-eight, July–October 1985, pp. 35–53, 80. ISSN 0143-5450.
 Hooton, E.R. Luftwaffe at War; Blitzkrieg in the West: 1939–1940, Volume 2. London: Midland Publishing, 2007. .
 Hooton, E.R. Luftwaffe at War: Gathering Storm 1933–1939, Volume 1. London: Chevron/Ian Allan, 2007. .

 Koniarek, Dr. Jan P. Polish Air Force 1939-1945. Carrollton, TX: Squadron/Signal Publications, Inc., 1994. .
 Liss, Witold. The P.Z.L. P-11. Leatherhead, Windsor, UK: Profile Publications Ltd., 1970.
 

 Taylor, John W.R. "PZL P.11." Combat Aircraft of the World from 1909 to the present. New York: G.P. Putnam's Sons, 1969. .
 Symanowski Grzegorz and Jan Hoffmann. PZL P.11C. Lublin, Poland: Kagero Polen, 2006. .
 Winchester, Jim. PZL P.11. Aircraft of World War II (The Aviation Factfile). Kent, UK: Grange Books plc, 2004. .

External links

 Recorded sound of the Bristol Mercury VI engine used in PZL P.11c (mp3 format)
 PZL P.11 "Walkaround" photos

1930s Polish fighter aircraft
World War II Polish fighter aircraft
Gull-wing aircraft
PZL aircraft
Single-engined tractor aircraft
Aircraft first flown in 1931